Owen Jones (born 1984) is an English political journalist and broadcaster.

Owen Jones may refer to:

 Owen Jones (American politician) (1819–1878), from Pennsylvania
 Owen Jones (antiquary) (1741–1814), Welsh antiquary
 Owen Jones (architect) (1809–1874), British architect, son of the antiquary
 Owen Jones (Canadian politician) (1890–1964), Member of Parliament
 Owen Jones (footballer) (1871–1955), British footballer
 Owen Jones (forester), English forester and aviator
 Owen Gethin Jones, Welsh building contractor, quarry owner and poet
 Owen Glynne Jones (1867–1899), British rock-climber and mountaineer
 Owen Thomas Jones (1878–1967), British geologist
 Owen Wynne Jones (1828–1870), British clergyman

See also
 Owen Bennett-Jones, British journalist
 Owen Wansbrough-Jones (1906–1983), British chemist and soldier
 Berenice Owen-Jones, Australian civil servant